The Cadigal, also spelled as Gadigal and Caddiegal, are a group of Indigenous people whose traditional lands are located in Gadi, on Eora country, the location of Sydney, New South Wales, Australia.

The Gadigal originally inhabited the area that they call "Gadi", which lies south of Port Jackson, covering today's Sydney central business district and stretching from South Head across to Marrickville/ with part of the southern boundary lying on the Cooks River; most notably Sydney Cove is located in Gadi, the site where the first Union Jack was raised, marking the beginning of colonisation. However, since colonisation and its subsequent spread, most Gadigal people have been displaced from their traditional lands.

Philip Gidley King gave Long Cove as the western boundary which lieutenant governor David Collins identified with present-day Darling Harbour. Arthur Phillip in a letter to Lord Sydney in February 1790 also reported: "From the entrance of the harbour, along the south shore, to the cove adjoining this settlement the district is called Cadi, and the tribe Cadigal ; the women, Cadigalleon".

The Gadigal are coastal people who were previously dependent on the harbour for providing most of their food whilst they were living in their traditional lands. They are one of seven clans from coastal Sydney who speak a common language and have become known as the Eora people. "Eora" refers to "people" or "of this place" in Dharug language.

European history
Soon after his arrival at Port Jackson, Governor Arthur Phillip estimated the Indigenous population of the area at around 1,500 people, although other estimates range from as low as 200 to as high as 4,000. The Cadigal clan was estimated to have 50-80 people.

The colonisation of the land by British settlers and the subsequent introduction of infectious diseases including smallpox decimated the local Dharug people and their neighbours. The disastrous 1789 smallpox epidemic was estimated to have killed about 53% of the local Dharug population,
and it was claimed that only three Cadigal people were left alive sometime in 1791, although archaeological evidence suggests that some Cadigal people may have escaped to the Concord area and settled there.

The former Marrickville Council area, now part of Inner West Council, is situated within Gadigal country and bordering Wangal country. In 1994 the Marrickville Aboriginal Consultative Committee was established and the committee established the Cadigal/Wangal peoples' website.

Gadigal Elder Allen Madden estimates that several hundred Dharug people, including at least a hundred Gadigal people in his own family, live in Sydney today.

Popular culture
Australian band Midnight Oil included a song "Gadigal Land" as a single in their The Makarrata Project mini-album project. The song includes a verse written and spoken by Gadigal poet Joel Davison. A statement from Sony Music Australia explained: "It is a provocative recount of what happened in this place, and elsewhere in Australia, since 1788".

On 5 December 2020 at the international rugby union match between Australia and Argentina in Sydney, a version of the Australian national anthem was sung first in the Dharug language by Wiradjuri woman Olivia Fox and the Australian Wallabies, followed by the English version. However, this was against Cultural Protocols as no Dharug Elders or Community were consulted or authorized the sharing of their language with a non-Dharug singer. This was the first time the anthem had been sung in an Indigenous language at a Wallabies match.

See also
 Aboriginal Australians

Notes

Citations

Sources

External links

Eora
Sydney